"Down on Me" is a song by American singer Jeremih, produced by Mick Schultz and Keith James, and mixed by mix engineer Ken Lewis. The song features rapper 50 Cent, and is the second single off his second album All About You. The song was released to US radio stations on October 12, 2010 by Def Jam.

Background
When asked about the collaboration, 50 Cent, in an interview with Angie Martinez, said: "I was just looking at him as an artist and I said he sounds good, and I thought he was a dope artist, so I said I'mma do it and we did the song, and then it took off. It made sense to me from an artist's perspective," he continued. "What I have now, the luxury of being in a secure space financially, is me having the ability to make decisions based on just the art."

Several media outlets falsely claim the song was produced by Tennessee producer Drumma Boy.

Music video
The official music video was shot in Los Angeles by director Colin Tilley on November 23, 2010 and was released on December 15, 2010. A 3D music video was released on 50 Cent's blog. The video begins in a club where a woman is dancing with an umbrella while dancing in front of the speakers. Meanwhile, Jeremih is seen on a chair while a woman is dancing beside him and also another woman is seen dancing while jamming her guitar. During the rap verse, 50 Cent is seen rapping his verse through a hole in the wall which is revealed to be a bar. Then, Jeremih and 50 Cent are seen separated in a rectangular wall while Jeremih sings the song. At the end of the video, Jeremih and 50 Cent stare at the camera while the video fades.

Chart performance
In the United Kingdom, the song debuted on the UK Singles Chart at number eighty-seven. After dropping out of the top 100 the following week, it re-entered the chart and has climbed up in chart for 16 weeks to reach a current peak of 30, marking his second top 40 hit in the UK. As of April 2011, the song has sold 200,000 copies in the UK.

The song debuted on the Billboard Hot 100 at number sixty-seven and peaked at number four in its twenty-third week. On the week of 28 February 2011, the song reached number one on the Billboard Rhythmic chart and stayed there for 6 weeks. As of April 2011, the song 2,042,000 digital downloads in the US.

In Romania, Down on Me became a number one success, as it entered the top ten of the Romanian Top 100 at number five on July 17, 2011 and climbed up to the top of the chart on the following week.

Charts

Weekly charts

Year-end charts

Certifications

Release history

See also
List of Romanian Top 100 number ones of the 2010s

References

External links

2010 singles
Number-one singles in Romania
Jeremih songs
50 Cent songs
Song recordings produced by Drumma Boy
Songs written by Drumma Boy
Songs written by 50 Cent
Music videos directed by Colin Tilley
Songs written by Mick Schultz
2010 songs
Def Jam Recordings singles
Dirty rap songs
Songs written by Jeremih